Currently there are 33 Catholic dioceses in Australia, consist of 5 metropolitan archdioceses, 21 suffragan dioceses, 2 non-metropolitan archdioceses, and 5 Eastern Rite dioceses. In addition there is a military ordinariate and a personal ordinariate.

List of dioceses

Australian Catholic Bishops Conference

Ecclesiastical Province of Adelaide
 Archdiocese of Adelaide
 Diocese of Darwin
 Diocese of Port Pirie

Ecclesiastical Province of Brisbane
 Archdiocese of Brisbane
 Diocese of Cairns
 Diocese of Rockhampton
 Diocese of Toowoomba
 Diocese of Townsville

Ecclesiastical Province of Melbourne
 Archdiocese of Melbourne
 Diocese of Ballarat
 Diocese of Sale
 Diocese of Sandhurst

Ecclesiastical Province of Perth
 Archdiocese of Perth
 Diocese of Broome
 Diocese of Bunbury
 Diocese of Geraldton

Ecclesiastical Province of Sydney
 Archdiocese of Sydney
 Diocese of Armidale
 Diocese of Bathurst
 Diocese of Broken Bay
 Diocese of Lismore
 Diocese of Maitland-Newcastle
 Diocese of Parramatta
 Diocese of Wagga Wagga
 Diocese of Wilcannia-Forbes
 Diocese of Wollongong

Immediately subject to the Holy See
 Archdiocese of Canberra and Goulburn
 Archdiocese of Hobart

Eastern Rite Dioceses
 Chaldean: Eparchy of St Thomas
 Maronite: Eparchy of St Maron
 Melkite: Eparchy of St Michael Archangel
 Syro-Malabar: Eparchy of St Thomas the Apostle
 Ukrainian: Eparchy of Saints Peter and Paul

Ordinariates
 Military Ordinariate of Australia
 Personal Ordinariate of Our Lady of the Southern Cross

References

External links 
 Dioceses - Catholic Church in Australia
 Catholic-Hierarchy
 GCatholic.org.

Australia
Catholic dioceses